The Insect-class gunboats (or large China gunboats) were a class of small, but well-armed Royal Navy ships designed for use in shallow rivers or inshore. They were intended for use on the Danube against Austria-Hungary (the China name was to disguise their function). The first four ships—Gnat, Mantis, Moth and Tarantula—were first employed during the Mesopotamian Campaign of the First World War on the Euphrates and Tigris rivers.

Design
The ships were designed by Yarrow to operate in shallow, fast-flowing rivers, with a shallow draught and a good turn of speed to counter river flow. They were fitted with two reciprocating (VTE) engines operating two propeller shafts to offer some redundancy. The propellers were housed in tunnels to minimise the operating draught. The main armament consisted of two 6-inch guns in single mountings fore and aft.

Deployment

Aphis, Bee, Ladybird and Scarab were deployed to Port Said, Egypt in 1915–16, Gnat, Mantis, Moth and Tarantula were sent to the Persian Gulf in 1916. Glowworm, Cicala, Cockchafer and  Cricket were deployed to the east coast of England in 1916 and had their main armament mountings modified to give higher elevation for anti-Zeppelin work.

In 1919, during the Russian Civil War, Glowworm, Cicala, Cockchafer, Cricket, Moth and Mantis served on the Dvina River (northern Russia, in Arkhangelsk Oblast), fighting in support of White Russian forces. Glowworms captain and some other crew members were killed when a nearby ammunition barge exploded. The crew of Cicala mutinied, as part of a wider wave of unrest in the Royal Navy and five "ringleaders" were sentenced to death, later commuted to five years' imprisonment.

Between the two world wars, the class were mainly used in the Far East and they were present during the Japanese invasion of China. In 1937, on the Yangtze river, the Japanese attacked , firing on her from a shore battery. A US gunboat,  was also attacked by Japanese aircraft and sunk. Scarab and Cricket were off Nanking in 1937 as the Japanese started to bomb the city.

At the start of the Second World War, three vessels, Cricket, Gnat and Ladybird, were transferred to the Inshore Squadron of the Mediterranean Fleet. They joined the monitor  and provided bombardment support for the Eighth Army. Their shallow draught allowed them to act also as supply and landing vessels, able to get close to beaches. In June 1943, Aphis took part in the bombardment of Pantelleria (Operation Corkscrew).

Ships in class
 : built by Ailsa shipbuilding,  scrapped Singapore, 1947.
 : built by Ailsa shipbuilding, flagship of Rear Admiral, Yangtze (RAY), sold in March 1939.
 : built by Barclay Curle, sunk by Japanese bombs on 21 December 1941.
 : built by Barclay Curle, sold for scrap in 1949, the last surviving member of the class.
 : built by Barclay Curle, heavily damaged by bombs on 29 June 1941; used as target by Royal Navy and sunk off Cyprus 1944.
 : built by Barclay Curle, scrapped September 1928.
 : built by Lobnitz, damaged by U-boat 21 October 1941, declared total loss, and then used as anti-aircraft platform. Scrapped 1946.
 : built by Lobnitz, sunk on 12 May 1941 off Tobruk during World War II, then used as an anti-aircraft position
 : built by Sunderland Shipbuilding Company Ltd, sold in January 1940 and subsequently scrapped.
 : built by Sunderland Shipbuilding Company Ltd, scuttled in Hong Kong 1941, captured and repaired by the Japanese and renamed Suma, sunk by mines in Yangtze River on 19 March 1945.
 : built by Wood, Skinner & Co, scrapped in 1948.
  built by Wood, Skinner & Co, briefly flagship of the British Pacific Fleet, expended as a target 1946.

Notes

Footnotes

References

External links

 Summary of the China gunboats of various nations
 More photos
  Transcription of ships' logbooks available for several members of the class.

 
Gunboat classes
World War I gunboats
 
 
Riverine warfare